Gordonians Hockey Club is a field hockey club, founded in 1911. It is based in Aberdeen, Scotland. The men's 1st XI play in the Scottish National League. Gordonians have 4 other teams; the 2nd XI, the 3rd XI, the 4th XI, the 5th XI as well as youth teams at all levels.

The home ground is at Countesswells, in Aberdeen. The club play on what is regarded as "one of the best water based pitches in the country."

Gordonians is one of the most successful teams in Scotland having won the Scottish Cup 4 times as well as 17 other National trophies

History
Gordonians Hockey Club was formed in 1911 to provide former pupils of Robert Gordon's College with the opportunity to continue playing hockey after their school years and to maintain contact with each other.  Although it was initially an exclusive club for former pupils, Gordonians now have an open membership policy as well as ladies and youth teams.  Gordonians continue to enjoy a strong relationship with the school and benefit from the use of the fantastic hockey facilities at Countesswells where two pitches were laid in 2004 - one water-based and one sand-based.

Gordonians played in friendly matches until the North District Leagues were formed in the 1960s.  The 1st XI was invited to join the newly formed National Leagues in 1976, and was placed in Division 3. They won Division 3 in their third season, won Division 2 the following season, and held their place in Division 1 of the National Leagues from 1980/81 to 2008/09 - a record 29 seasons.

Although Gordonians have not yet won the NL1 title, the 1st XI came within one point of the Scottish Championship in 1996 and were runners-up again in 1998. They have, however, had considerable success in cup competitions having won the Scottish Cup 4 times and as a result represented Scotland in the European Cup Winners Cup in Poznan (1994), The Hague (1996), Rome (1998), and Eindhoven (2002). Gordonians also took part in the inaugural European Cup Winners Cup in Barcelona in 1990, having finished as runners up in the 1989 Scottish Cup to the league champions that year.

The 2nd XI have won the National Scottish Districts Cup for 2nd XI teams 8 times, only bettered by one other club. The 2nd XI joined the Scottish Regional League North in 2000 when the regional leagues were formed and have won it 8 times.  Prior to this they had won the North District League Division One a total of 12 times.

The formation of the regional leagues allowed the 3rd XI the opportunity to dominate North District League 1 from 2000, and they have won it 6 times.  The 3rd XI have also won the National Scottish Reserve Cup 6 times. In 2009 the 3rd XI stepped up to the Regional League North. The club's 4th XI  play in the North District League Division 1 winning the title for the first time in 2007 and again in 2008, with our 3rd XI finishing as runners-up on both occasions. In 2008 the 4th XI won their first national trophy, the Scottish Reserve Plate.

In May 2001, Gordonians merged with Merlins Ladies Hockey Club to form a combined club. Merlins Gordonians won the Scottish Districts Cup in 2005 and elected to move up from the North District League to the National League 3 in 2005/6. They won NL3 in only their second season in 2007 and finished a very creditable 4th in NL2 in 2008, but due to the loss of some key players to universities elsewhere were relegated back to NL3 in 2009 but became NL3 Champions for the second time in 2010 and are back playing in NL2.

The Club has been running a very successful Youth Coaching programme for the past ten years with around 90 boys and girls attending Tuesday coaching sessions, and competing in national competitions at U-14, U-16 and U-18 level. It has taken the U-18 boys on tour to the Netherlands every Easter since 2004 and several of these boys have gone on to gain promotion to the  1st or 2nd XIs. In 2008/9, nine of them were selected for Scotland training squads across three age levels.

Men's 1st XI Recent Honours
European Cup Winners Cup
Bronze Medal, 'A/B' Division - 1990 (Barcelona)
Silver Medal, B Division - 1994 (Poznan)
7th  Place, A Division - 1996 (The Hague)
6th  Place, B Division - 1998 (Rome)
7th Place, A Division – 2002 (Eindhoven)

Scottish Cup WINNERS - 1993, 1995, 1997, 2001
Runners Up - 1989

SHU National League Division 1
Runners Up - 1996, 1998

SHU National League Division 2 CHAMPIONS - 1980,2012,2018

SHU National League Division 3 CHAMPIONS - 1979

Men's 2nd XI Recent Honours
Scottish District Cup WINNERS   1984,1988,1989,1995,1996,2000,2001,2011

finalists – 1999, 2003, 2010

Scottish District Champions Cup WINNERS    1989 (no longer competed for)

Regional League (North) CHAMPIONS  2000, 2001, 2002, 2004, 2005, 2008, 2010, 2011

runners up  - 1998,1999, 2003, 2007

North District Division 1 CHAMPIONS 1977, 1986, 1987, 1989, 1990, 1991, 1992, 1993, 1994, 1995, 1996, 1997

Men's 3rd XI Recent Honours
Scottish Reserve Cup WINNERS 1996, 1997, 2000, 2001, 2002, 2008
finalists - 1993,1995,1999

North District Division 1 CHAMPIONS 1998, 2000, 2001, 2002, 2004, 2006, 2009, 2010

North District Division 2 CHAMPIONS 1988

North District Division 3 CHAMPIONS 1973, 1975

Men's 4th XI Recent Honours
Scottish Reserve Plate WINNERS 2008

finalists  - 2009

North District Division 1 CHAMPIONS 2007, 2008

North District Division 3 CHAMPIONS 1989

References

Sports teams in Aberdeen
Scottish field hockey clubs
Field hockey clubs established in 1911
1911 establishments in Scotland